Activated PI3K delta syndrome (APDS) is a primary immunodeficiency disease caused by activating gain of function mutations in the PIK3CD gene. Which encodes the p110δ catalytic subunit of PI3Kδ,  APDS-2 (PASLI-R1) is caused by exon-skipping mutations in PIK3R1 which encodes for the regulatory subunit p85α. APDS and APDS-2 affected individuals present with similar symptoms, which include increased susceptibility to airway infections, bronchiectasis and lymphoproliferation.

Symptoms and signs
The signs and symptoms of activated PI3K Delta Syndrome are consistent with the following:
 Immunodeficiency
 Lymphadenopathy
 Sinopulmonary infections
 Bronchiectasis

Cause
In terms of genetics, activated PI3K Delta Syndrome is autosomal dominant, a mutation in phosphatidylinositol 4,5-bisphosphate 3-kinase catalytic subunit delta isoform is the reason for this condition (located at chromosome 1p36.)

Mechanism

The pathophysiology of activated PI3K delta syndrome has several aspects. The normal function has P110δ (PI3K) involved in immune system regulation.

P110δ effect is not limited to the immune system; P110δ has a presence in transformed epithelial cells and cell adhesion molecules (airway inflammation), and research has been done on the possibility of P110δ in the nervous system.

Activated PI3K delta syndrome effect indicates affected individuals are likely to have activation-induced cell death. Normally, PI3K-delta signaling assists B cells and T cells to mature; however, overactive PI3K-delta has an effect on the B and T cell differentiation (the process by which cells eventually are different from one another).

Consequently, there is an inability to confront an infection, as well as early cell death. Furthermore, overproduction of said signal can cause lymphadenopathy (which is an enlargement of lymph nodes) due to excess white blood cells.

Diagnosis
In order to ascertain if an individual has activated PI3K delta syndrome, usually one finds atypical levels of immunoglobulins. Methods to determine the condition are the following:
 Genetic testing
 Laboratory findings
 Symptoms exhibited

Treatment

Infections for this condition, are treated or prevented in the following general ways:
 Bacterial infection should be treated rapidly (with antibiotics)
 Antiviral therapy
 Modify lifestyle (exposure to pathogens need to be minimized)

See also
 Primary immunodeficiency

References

Further reading

External links 

Combined T and B–cell immunodeficiencies